Sadio Ba (born 24 January 1973) is a retired Belgian football player and currently football coach. He played as a right midfielder.

Ba previously played with K.V.C. Westerlo for several seasons in the Belgian First Division.

Honours
Westerlo
Belgian Cup: 2000-01

References

External links
 Profile and stats - Lokeren
 

1973 births
Living people
Belgian footballers
K.S.C. Lokeren Oost-Vlaanderen players
K.S.K. Beveren players
F.C.V. Dender E.H. players
K.V.C. Westerlo players
LASK players
Belgian football managers
K.R.C. Mechelen managers
Footballers from Ghent
K.V. Woluwe-Zaventem players
Association football defenders